This is a list of notable people with the given name Mikhail:

People with name "Mikhail"
 Mikhail, Prince of Abkhazia, the head of state of the Principality of Abkhazia
 Mikhail of Vladimir, second and fourth Prince of Vladimir
 Mikhail Ageyev (1931–2005), Soviet and Russian scientist
 Mikhail Alexandrovich, Latvian Jewish tenor and cantor
 Mikhail An, Soviet football player
 Mikhail Nikolaevich Artemenkov (born 1978), Russian historian and teacher
 Mikhail Bakhtin, Russian philosopher
 Mikhail Bakunin, founder of Collectivist Anarchism
 Mikhail Barsukov, former head of the Russian FSB
 Mikhail Baryshnikov, Soviet Latvian-born Russian-American ballet dancer, choreographer, and actor
 Mikhail Botvinnik, Soviet Chess Grandmaster and World Chess Champion
 Mikhail Boyarsky, Soviet actor and singer
 Mikhail Bulgakov, Russian writer and medical doctor
 Mikhail M. Diakonoff (1907–1954), Soviet orientalist
 Mikhail Farikh (1959–2016), Russian private helicopter pilot
 Mikhail Fiksel, Russian-American sound designer
 Mikhail Fradkov, former Prime Minister of Russia
 Mikhail Fridman, Russian oligarch
 Mikhail Frinovsky, deputy head of NKVD and Great Purge perpetrator
 Mikhail Frunze, Bolshevik leader during and just prior to the Russian Revolution of 1917
 Mikhail Gorbachev, last leader of the Soviet Union (USSR)
 Mikhail Grabovski, Belarusian former ice hockey centre
 Mikhail Illarionovich Kutuzov, Russian field marshal
 Mikhail Kalashnikov, creator of AK 47 and other Kalashnikov firearms
 Mikhail Kalinin, first chairman of the Presidium of the Supreme Soviet
 Mikhail Kamkin (born 1985), Russian professional footballer
 Mikhail Kasyanov, former Prime Minister of Russia
 Mikhail Khabarov (born 1971), Russian businessman and manager
 Mikhail Khergiani, Georgian mountaineer
 Mikhail Khodorkovsky, former Russian oligarch
 Mikhail Khorobrit, Eleventh Prince of Vladimir
 Mikhail Khudyakov (1894–1936), Soviet archaeologist
 Mikhail Kissine (born 1980), Belgian linguist
 Mikhail Kolyada, Russian figure skater and Olympic Silver Medal winner
 Mikhail Kotlyarov (born 1963), Russian classical crossover tenor and recording artist
 Mikhail Kuklev, Russian professional ice hockey defenceman
 Mikhail Kutuzov, Field Marshal of the Russian Empire
 Mikhail Kuzovlev, Russian banker and financer
 Mikhail Lermontov, Russian poet
 Mikhail Levit (born 1944), Soviet-born Israeli photographer and pictorialist
 Mikhail Lomonosov, Russian polymath
 Mikhail Makarov, Soviet serial killer known as The Executioner
 Mikhail Mishustin, current prime minister of Russia
 Mikhail Mizintsev, Russian colonel general currently serving as head of the National Defense Management Center of Russia and war criminal known as the "Butcher of Mariupol"
 Mikhail Mokretsov, former director of the Russian Federal Taxation Service
 Mikhail Murashko, current Minister of Health of the Russian Federation
 Mikhail Naimy
 Mikhail Novosyolov, Soviet-Tajik serial killer
 Mikhail Perez (born 1990), former international soccer player for the Dominican Republic
 Mikhail Pletnev, Russian pianist, conductor and composer
 Mikhail Pokrovsky, Russian historian
 Mikhail Popkov, Russian serial killer and rapist
 Mikhail Prokhorov, Russian oligarch
 Mikhail Romanov, first Romanov Tsar of Russia
 Mikhail Sagin (born 1962), former Russian footballer
 Mikhail Saltykov-Shchedrin, 19th century Russian writer and satirist
 Mikhail Sergachev, NHL player for the Tampa Bay Lightning team
 Mikhail Shchadov (1927–2011), Russian engineer and politician
 Mikhail Sholokov, Soviet writer and winner of the 1965 Nobel Prize in Literature
 Mikhail Yuryevich Simonov (born 1959), Russian direct marketing pioneer
 Mikhail Skobelev, Russian general known for his conquest of Central Asia
 Mikhail Solomentsev, Soviet politician
 Mikhail Sovetlyanov (born 1987), Russian professional footballer
 Mikhail Speransky, Russian reformer
 Mikhail Spokoyny (born 1955), Ukrainian scientist
 Mikhail Studenetsky, Soviet basketball player and Olympic Silver Medal winner
 Mikhail L. Surguchev (1928–1991), USSR petroleum scientist
 Mikhail Suslov, Russian statesman
 Mikhail Svetov (politician), Russian politician and chairman of the "Civil Society" movement
 Mikhail Tal, Soviet chess grandmaster and World Chess Champion
 Mikhail Trepashkin, former Russian FSB officer who conducted independent review of Russian Apartment Bombings
 Mikhail Trilisser, Soviet intelligence officer
 Mikhail Trinoga, current adviser to the President of Russia
 Mikhail Tsaturian (born 1985), Russian artist
 Mikhail Tsvet, inventor of chromatography
 Mikhail Tukhachevsky, Soviet general who led the post-revolution Soviet campaign against Poland
 Mikhail Tyurin, Russian cosmonaut
 Mikhail Ustyantsev (born 1992), Russian ice hockey player
 Mikhail Varshavski, D.O., Russian-born American internet celebrity and family medicine physician
 Mikhail Vladimirsky, temporary chairman of the All-Russian Central Executive Committee
 Mikhail Yaroslavich, 21st Prince of Vladimir and Orthodox saint
 Mikhail Yasnov, chairman of the Presidium of the Supreme Soviet of the RSFSR
 Mikhail Yevseyev (born 1973), Russian footballer
 Mikhail Yudin (footballer), footballer in the Russian Football National League
 Mikhail Yudin (serial killer), Russian serial killer known as The Berdsk Maniac
 Mikhail Yuryev, Russian politician who served as a member of the State Duma between 1996 and 1999
 Mikhail Nikolayevich Zadornov, Russian stand-up comedian and writer
 Mikhail Mikhailovich Zadornov, former First Deputy Prime Minister of Russia
 Mikhail Zurabov, former Minister of Health of the Russian Federation

Variants

Mikhael
 Mikhael Gromov, Russian-French mathmetician known for his work in the field of geometry
 Mikhael Jaimez-Ruiz, Venezuelan footballer
 Mikhael Mirilashvili, Russian oligarch
 Mikhael Subotzky, South African artist

Mikheil
 Mikheil Saakashvili, third president of Georgia

Mikhail